Thespesia mossambicensis is a species of flowering plant in the mallow family, Malvaceae, that is endemic to Mozambique.

References

mossambicensis
Least concern plants
Endemic flora of Mozambique
Taxonomy articles created by Polbot